The 1917 Washington and Lee Generals football team represented the Washington and Lee Generals of Washington and Lee during the 1917 college football season.

Schedule

References

Washington and Lee
Washington and Lee Generals football seasons
Washington and Lee Generals football